Hanasaari can refer to the following places in Finland:
 Hanasaari, Helsinki, a neighbourhood and a former island in Helsinki
 Hanasaari Power Plant, a coal power plant located in the neighbourhood of Hanasalmi in Helsinki
 Hanasaari, Espoo, an island and a neighbourhood in the district of Westend in Espoo
 Hanasaari Swedish-Finnish cultural centre, a cultural centre located in the neighbourhood of Hanasaari in Espoo